Events in the year 1978 in the People's Republic of China.

Incumbents 
 Paramount leader - Hua Guofeng → Deng Xiaoping
 Chairman of the Chinese Communist Party – Hua Guofeng
 Premier of the People's Republic of China – Hua Guofeng
 Chairman of the Standing Committee of the National People's Congress – Ye Jianying
 Chairman of the Chinese People's Political Consultative Conference – Deng Xiaoping

Governors  
 Governor of Anhui Province – Song Peizhang then Wan Li
 Governor of Fujian Province – Liao Zhigao
 Governor of Gansu Province – Song Ping 
 Governor of Guangdong Province – Wei Guoqing  
 Governor of Guizhou Province – Ma Li 
 Governor of Hebei Province – Liu Zihou 
 Governor of Heilongjiang Province – Yang Yichen
 Governor of Henan Province – Liu Jianxun then Duan Junyi    
 Governor of Hubei Province – Zhao Xinchu then Chen Pixian  
 Governor of Hunan Province – Mao Zhiyong  
 Governor of Jiangsu Province – Xu Jiatun 
 Governor of Jiangxi Province – Jiang Weiqing 
 Governor of Jilin Province – Wang Enmao 
 Governor of Liaoning Province – Zeng Shaoshan (until September), Ren Zhongyi (starting September)
 Governor of Qinghai Province – Tan Qilong 
 Governor of Shaanxi Province – Wang Renzhong (until December), Wang Renzhong (starting December)
 Governor of Shandong Province – Bai Rubing  
 Governor of Shanxi Province – Wang Qian  
 Governor of Sichuan Province – Zhao Ziyang 
 Governor of Yunnan Province – An Pingsheng  
 Governor of Zhejiang Province – Tie Ying

Events

December
 December 18 to 22 – 3rd Plenary Session of the 11th Central Committee of the Communist Party was held. The conference marked the beginning of the "Reform and Opening Up" policy.

Births

Deaths

See also 
 1978 in Chinese film

References 

 
Years of the 20th century in China
China
1978